On June 27, 2022, at approximately 12:30 a.m., Akron, Ohio, police officers killed Jayland Walker, a 25-year-old American black man from Akron. Following a traffic stop and car chase, officers pursued on foot and fired more than 90 times at Walker. Autopsy results showed that Walker's body was hit by 46 bullets.

Walker was not carrying a weapon when killed. A handgun was later found in Walker's car, and officers reported a firearm being discharged during the preceding car chase.  Police said a bullet casing consistent with the recovered handgun was found in the area where they say a shot was fired.

Background 
At approximately 2:30 a.m. on June 26, 2022, a New Franklin police officer attempted to pull over a vehicle owned by Walker, because the car had a broken taillight and a missing license plate bulb. The driver failed to stop and drove at speeds approaching 50 mph on city streets before crossing the Akron city line, at which point the pursuing officer ended the less-than-three-minute chase.

Incident 

According to the Akron Police Department, at about 12:30 a.m. on June 27, 2022, police in Akron, Ohio, attempted to stop Walker for a traffic violation on unspecified equipment failure.
Walker did not stop and a chase ensued. According to the pursuing officers, gunfire came from the vehicle less than a minute into the chase. After several minutes, Walker exited the highway and the chase continued along city streets.

Eventually, Walker's car slowed down, and while the car was still moving, Walker exited from the passenger's side, wearing a ski mask, and ran towards a nearby parking lot.
Officers chased Walker and attempted to stop him with a stun gun but were not successful.
After about ten seconds of chasing Walker, eight police officers opened fire for six or seven seconds, shooting approximately 90 rounds.
Police said that it appeared Walker was turning towards them, and they believed he was armed and "moving into a firing position".

Following the shooting, Walker was put in handcuffs by police and was found with his hands cuffed behind his back when EMTs arrived on the scene. According to police, officers attempted to administer first aid to Walker after he was shot. Walker was pronounced dead at the scene. No firearm was found on Walker's body.
The Summit County Medical Examiner’s Office has ruled his death a homicide.

On July 15, 2022, the medical examiner released autopsy results. Walker's body was hit with 46 bullets in total, and the toxicology report showed that no drugs or alcohol were present in his system.

Investigation 

Police recovered a pistol, a loaded magazine, and a wedding ring on the driver's seat of Walker's car. A bullet casing that police say is consistent with the recovered pistol was found along the highway in the area where police say Walker fired.

The eight officers who opened fire were placed on paid administrative leave following standard protocol in a police shooting. On October 11, the officers were reinstated to administrative duties. Police Chief Steve Mylett said he was forced to do so because of a shortage of officers. The Ohio Bureau of Criminal Investigation is leading the probe into the shooting.

Body camera footage 

On July 3, 2022, police held a press conference and released body camera video from the eight officers who opened fire, as well as five additional officers on the scene.

At the press conference, police displayed still images that they say showed a muzzle flash coming from Walker's vehicle during the highway chase.

Police also displayed still images that they say showed Walker reaching towards his waist area during the foot chase, turning towards an officer, and making "a forward motion of his arm".

The body camera footage released by police ends after the officers opened fire and does not depict what happened afterwards.

Reactions 
The day of the shooting, protesters gathered outside the police department in downtown Akron. Standoffs with police and tense moments occurred. Barricades were installed around the police department on July 2. Protests went on for more than three days straight.

Akron officials announced that July 4 celebrations would be cancelled due to the shooting. Akron mayor Dan Horrigan declared a state of emergency and issued a curfew for the downtown Akron area in response to property destruction during night-time protests. The curfew was lifted on July 17, 2022.

In November 2022 voters approved creating a permanent police oversight board and police auditor for the Akron Police Department.

See also 

 Lists of killings by law enforcement officers in the United States

References

External links 
 Akron Police Critical Incident Video Release 22-78920

2022 controversies in the United States
2022 in Ohio
African Americans shot dead by law enforcement officers in the United States
Black Lives Matter
June 2022 events in the United States
Deaths by firearm in Ohio
Filmed deaths in the United States
Filmed killings by law enforcement
History of Akron, Ohio
Law enforcement controversies in the United States
Law enforcement in Ohio